MS Tamya, also known as Tamya Youth Center, or simply Tamya YC, is an Egyptian football club based in Tamya, Fayoum, Egypt. The club is currently playing in the Egyptian Second Division, the second-highest league in the Egyptian football league system.

Egyptian Second Division
Football clubs in Egypt